Hospital General may refer to:

Hospital General (Barcelona–Vallès Line), Spain
Hospital General metro station (Mexico City), Mexico
Hospital General (Mexico City Metrobús), a BRT station in Mexico City

See also